The Historian's Craft is a 1949 book by Marc Bloch and first published in English in 1953 (New York: Knopf) (it was the first of his works to be translated into English). At that stage he was not as well known in the English-speaking world as he was to be in the 1960s where his works on feudal society and rural history were published. The book was written in 1941 and 1942. Bloch joined the French Resistance prior to its completion.

Content
The work explores the craft of the historian from a number of different angles and discusses what constitutes history and how it should be configured and created in literary form by the historian. The scope of the work is broad across space and time: in one chapter, for instance, he cites a number of examples of erroneous history-writing and forgeries, citing sources as wide-ranging as the Commentaries of Julius Caesar and the Protocols of the Elders of Zion.  His approach is one that is configured not for those who are necessarily professional historians themselves (members of what he referred to as "the guild") but instead for all interested readers and non-specialists.

Bloch also expressed the viewpoint that the craft of the historian should not be a judgmental one – that the historian should attempt to explain and describe rather than evaluate in normative terms. At one stage in the work, Bloch observes that "the mania for making judgments" is a "satanic enemy of true history".

Reaction

The Historian's Craft has been described as unrepresentative of his historical approach in that they discuss contemporary events in which Bloch was personally involved and without access to primary sources. Along with the unfinished Strange Defeat it was published posthumously in 1949. Davies has described The Historian's Craft as "beautifully sensitive and profound"; the book was written in response to his son, Étienne, asking his father, "what is history?". In his introduction, Bloch wrote to Febvre.

References

External links
Online-Publication (critical summary / book review) „Apologie der Geschichtswissenschaft – oder: Der Beruf des Historikers“ (engl.: The historian's craft), Department of History, Leibniz University Hanover [PDF; ger]

1949 non-fiction books
French books
Works by Marc Bloch